The Men's 3000 Metres Steeplechase event at the 1932 Summer Olympics was 3460 metres due to an error in lap counting – the runners did an extra lap of the track.

Results

Round One
The fastest five athletes in each of the two heats advanced to the Final Round.

Heat One

Heat Two

Final

References

Athletics at the 1932 Summer Olympics
Steeplechase at the Olympics
Men's events at the 1932 Summer Olympics